Bite the Bullet is the fourth EP released by the band Black Tide. It was scheduled to be released in the fall of 2013 under the label InnerCat Music Group. The EP was produced and engineered by Mariano Aponte. This is the first release without drummer Steven Spence. The first single titled "Not Afraid", was released on August 31.

Background
In an interview with The Vinne Langdon show, bassist Zakk Sandler stated that he was not invited to be a part of the Just Another Drug EP. Later, it led to the departure of him and drummer Steven Spence.

According to Gabriel Garcia, "“So as you all know we've been working on a six song EP. We're excited to let you all know it'll be titled Bite The Bullet. We recently finished tracking Bite The Bullet at Live House studios in Miami, FL with producer/engineer Mariano Aponte formerly of Silvia Massy's world famous RadioStar Studios. We really went back to our roots on this one and it is being mixed right now! Can't wait for you all to hear this!”

On August 31, the band released their first single off their forthcoming EP, titled "Not Afraid".

Writing and recording
On October 13, 2012, Gabriel tweeted "So excited to let all our fans know that I'm currently on my way to Georgia to start working on demos for Black Tide's 3rd cd!!!!".

On July 3, 2013, Black Tide stated that they were going through a line-up change, and that they are working on a new Black Tide EP (6 songs).

Bite the Bullet was tracked at Live House Studios in Miami with producer and engineer Mariano Aponte at the helm.

Track listing

Personnel
Black Tide
Gabriel Garcia – lead vocals, lead guitar, bass
Austin Diaz – rhythm guitar, backing vocals
Tim D'Onofrio – drums, percussion

References

2013 EPs
Black Tide albums